The United States Penitentiary, Terre Haute (USP Terre Haute) is a maximum-security United States federal prison for male inmates in Terre Haute, Indiana. It is part of the Federal Correctional Complex, Terre Haute (FCC Terre Haute) and is operated by the Federal Bureau of Prisons, a division of the United States Department of Justice. USP Terre Haute houses a Special Confinement Unit for male federal inmates who have been sentenced to death as well as the federal execution chamber. Most inmates sentenced to death by the U.S. federal government are housed in USP Terre Haute prior to execution, with few exceptions.

History
The opening of the prison in this city was partly due to heavy promotion by Terre Haute's Chamber of Commerce, which eventually went on to raise $50,000 to pay for the property on which the prison was built. The residents of Terre Haute initially embraced the prison due to the impression that it would provide jobs to local residents in addition to helping Terre Haute's economy while only housing non-violent offenders. E.B. Swope was the prison's first warden.

The U.S. Public Works Administration issued a $3 million grant to pay for construction of USP Terre Haute in 1938. Construction cost of the institution at the time that it was built was $2,150,000. The architectural design of the prison is a modified telephone pole design with all housing and other facilities opening onto a long central corridor. It was the first penitentiary for adult felons ever to be constructed without a wall. In 2004, the new USP was built on adjoining property, with the old penitentiary becoming the medium-security Federal Correctional Institution, Terre Haute.

USP Terre Haute was one of the first federal prisons to emphasize rehabilitation by providing psychological and psychiatric treatment, referring to prisoners by names as opposed to numbers, and allowing prisoners to talk during meals instead of eating in silence. The institution initiated the use of the word "inmate" as opposed to other less-appealing labels such as "convict" or "criminal". It also became one of the first federal prisons to implement educational programs in prisons with sessions devoted to improving the inmates' skills in reading, writing, maths, as well as trades.

Camp 5, part of the Guantanamo Bay detention camps, on the island of Cuba, is reported to have been based on the design of USP Terre Haute.

Facility
USP Terre Haute is a Care Level 3 facility, which means that any inmate sent to Terre Haute who has serious health problems that are not major enough to warrant hospitalization is sent to the USP. This facility is also a tobacco-free institution. This part of the FCC contains six housing units. One of the six housing units is a faith-based unit that can house 125 inmates. When the inmates are not working, they are partaking in faith-based activities. All of the inmates in the USP are allotted seven visit-days a month and 300 minutes of telephone time, which they have to use in increments of 30 minutes or less. The inmates housed here can work at UNICOR, which is a prison industry that makes towels and other accessories for the military. Inmates employed here earn an average of $6.50 to $7.50 a day and some can make up to $12 a day if they are paid by piece as opposed to by the hour.

Death row
On July 19, 1993, the federal government designated USP Terre Haute as the site where federal death sentences would be carried out, including the establishment of the "Special Confinement Unit", the federal death row for men. The Bureau of Prisons modified USP Terre Haute in 1995 and 1996 so it could house death row functions. On July 13, 1999, the Special Confinement Unit at USP Terre Haute opened, and the BOP transferred male federal death row inmates from other federal prisons and from state prisons to USP Terre Haute.

There are currently 44 men on federal death row. The vast majority of these are housed at USP Terre Haute, which currently houses 42 death row inmates. The federal government chose Terre Haute as the location of the men's death row due to its central location within the United States.

Since 1963, sixteen people have been executed by the United States federal government. All sixteen were executed at USP Terre Haute. Timothy McVeigh, who was convicted for his responsibility for the Oklahoma City bombing, was the first prisoner executed by the U.S. federal government since the moratorium on the death penalty was lifted in 1976. The method of execution used by the federal government is lethal injection.

Notable inmates

See also
List of U.S. federal prisons
Federal Bureau of Prisons
Incarceration in the United States
Capital punishment by the United States federal government
List of people executed by the United States federal government

References

Further reading

External links

USP Terre Haute Official Website

United States Penitentiaries
Prisons in Indiana
Buildings and structures in Terre Haute, Indiana
Capital punishment in the United States
Execution sites in the United States
1940 establishments in Indiana